A Boomerang cocktail is a specific cocktail dating back to the early 20th century. In the 21st century, it may also be a reference to cocktails that bartenders illegally shuttle back and forth between bars as a way of sharing experimentation or building comradery.

Boomerang as a specific cocktail
The Official Mixer's Manual lists the popularized version of the Boomerang Cocktail as calling for:
 1/3 Rye Whiskey
 1/3 Swedish Punsch
 1/3 Dry Vermouth
 1 dash Angostura bitters
 1 dash lemon juice

To be stirred well with ice and strained into a glass.

The Cafe Royal Cocktail Book lists the same recipe. The Savoy Cocktail Book lists the same recipe, but calls for "Canadian Club whisky" instead of rye. The Standard Cocktail Guide employed rye whiskey but calls for different proportions, with 1 oz rye, 3/4 oz. swedish punsch, 3/4 oz. sweet vermouth, 2 dashes of lemon juice, and 1 dash of Angostura bitters.

Trader Vic lists the same recipe in his 1947 Bartender's Guide as was in the Official Mixer's Manual but substitutes the rye with bourbon.

Prior to World War II, the original Boomerang Cocktail was associated with a South African origin, and likely referred to the boomerang as used for hunting. The drink reached its zenith for a period of time after World War II, when the early Atomic Age and Space Age began to influence Las Vegas and popular culture in terms of architecture, furniture, fabrics, and style, including boomerang shaped cocktail tables, barware, and so-called "atomic cocktails".  Flying-themed cocktail names were also popular during this time.

Boomerang as a shuttled cocktail
A Boomerang cocktail may also refer to alcoholic drinks that bartenders send back and forth to each other from competing bars.  It is considered a friendly gesture within the industry, but is typically illegal.

In popular culture
The Boomerang cocktail was the featured drink for episode #14 of the pioneering video podcast Tiki Bar TV.

See also
 Atomic cocktails

References 

Cocktails with whisky
Cocktails with vermouth
Cocktails with bitters
Cocktails with Swedish Punsch
Cocktails with rye whisky
Cocktails with Angostura bitters
Cocktails with lemon juice
Space Age